The 1953–54 Cypriot Second Division was the first season of the Cypriot second-level football league. Aris Limassol FC won their 1st title.

Format
Nine teams participated in the 1953–54 Cypriot Second Division. The league was split to two geographical groups, depending from Districts of Cyprus each participated team came from. All teams of a group played against each other twice, once at their home and once away. The team with the most points at the end of the season crowned group champions. The winners of each group were playing against each other in the final phase of the competition and the winner were the champions of the Second Division. The champion was promoted to 1954–55 Cypriot First Division. 

Teams received two points for a win, one point for a draw and zero points for a loss.

Stadiums and locations

Nicosia-Famagusta-Larnaca Group
League standings

Results

Limassol-Paphos Group
Aris Limassol FC was the champions.

Results

Champions Playoffs 
Aris 3–2 Demi Spor Larnaca
Demi Spor Larnaca 3–3 Aris

Aris Limassol were the champions of the Second Division. Aris Limassol promoted to 1954–55 Cypriot First Division.

References

See also
 Cypriot Second Division
 1953–54 Cypriot First Division
 1953–54 Cypriot Cup

Cypriot Second Division seasons
Cyprus
1953–54 in Cypriot football